The NATO Programming Centre (NPC) is part of the NATO Communications and Information Agency (NCIA).  The NPC is responsible for system support and maintenance of the Air Command and Control Systems (Air C2).

The centre is located in Glons, a village close to the cities of Tongeren and Liège, Belgium.  It employs nearly 200 people.  It is an integral part of the NCIA's Air C2 Programme Office and Services, previously known as NATO ACCS Management Agency (NACMA) for the ACCS Programme and with the NATO Support Agency (NSPA) for the maintenance of various Air Command and Control systems.

References

External links 
 NPC official site
 NCI Agency
 NSPA
 NATO structure

Bassenge
Information operations units and formations of NATO